Percy Forrest  (November 8, 1916 – May 9, 1994) was an American baseball pitcher in the Negro leagues. He played from 1938 to 1945 with the Chicago American Giants, New York Black Yankees and Newark Eagles.

References

External links
 and Seamheads

Chicago American Giants players
New York Black Yankees players
Newark Eagles players
1916 births
1994 deaths
20th-century African-American sportspeople
Baseball pitchers